James Delaney (August 26, 1896 – April 20, 1970) was the Mayor of Anchorage, Alaska from 1929 to 1932.

Biography
James J. Delaney, Sr. was born in Castlerea, County Roscommon, Ireland on August 26, 1896. He came to Anchorage, Alaska in 1916 to work on the railroad for the Alaskan Engineering Commission (known after its 1923 completion as the Alaska Railroad). In 1929, he married Nancy Marie Dillon (born March 5, 1896, in Aghamore, County Mayo, Ireland). The Delaneys had three children: Nancy, James, Jr., and Loretta.

In 1929, Delaney was elected to the first of three consecutive terms as Mayor. His first year in office, he successfully petitioned the General Land Office for the title to the land that would become Merrill Field. The field abutting downtown which was serving as an airstrip at that time was later renamed the Delaney Park Strip.

Delaney died April 20, 1970, and was buried in Anchorage Memorial Park; Nancy would survive him by 16 years, dying in Anchorage on December 29, 1986.

References 

 James Delaney at Anchorage Memorial Park Cemetery

1896 births
1970 deaths
Mayors of Anchorage, Alaska
Irish emigrants to the United States (before 1923)
20th-century American politicians